Klepto is a 2003 straight-to-DVD independent thriller film starring Meredith Bishop and Jsu Garcia. It is the debut film of director Thomas Trail and premiered at the 2003 CineVegas Film Festival.

Plot
In Los Angeles, Emily Brown is a kleptomaniac who is addicted to pills and misses her jailed father, and is undergoing therapy trying to resolve her compulsion. She has a police record for shoplifting, and her mother Teresa is a compulsive shopper. The security guard Nick, of Bernstein's department store, sees Emily through a camera and becomes fascinated with her. When Nick gets in trouble dealing ecstasy, he presses Emily to help him rob Bernstein's.

References

External links
 [archived]

American independent films
2003 films
American thriller drama films
2000s thriller drama films
2003 drama films
Magnolia Pictures films
2000s English-language films
2000s American films